The Inkigayo Chart is a music program record chart that gives an award to the best-performing single of the week in South Korea. The chart measured digital performance in domestic online music services (55%), social media via YouTube views (35%), advanced viewer votes (5%), and album sales (5%) in its ranking methodology. The candidates for the number-one song of the week received additional points from live votes.

In 2017, there were 37 singles that ranked number one on the chart and 30 music acts received award trophies for this feat. Five songs collected trophies for three weeks and earned a Triple Crown: Suzy's and Baekhyun's "Dream"; GFriend's "Rough" and "Navillera"; and Twice's "Cheer Up" and "TT".

Rapper Gary won an award for "Lonely Night" despite a lack of promotional activities on music programs. Girl group GFriend received its first Inkigayo award with "Rough". Upon topping the ranking with "You're the Best", Mamamoo won its first music show award two years and two months after its debut. Other first-time Inkigayo award winners include: Got7's "Fly", Twice's "Cheer Up", Blackpink's "Whistle", and I.O.I's "Very Very Very". On the June 19 broadcast, "Monster" by Exo accumulated a perfect score of 11,000 points.

Chart history

References 

2016 in South Korean music
2016 record charts
Lists of number-one songs in South Korea